Mary Lee Settle (July 29, 1918 – September 27, 2005) was an American writer.

She won the 1978 National Book Award for her novel Blood Tie. She was a founder of the annual PEN/Faulkner Award for Fiction.

"Settle has gone so unnoticed by the academic community that the most recurrent subject among those few who have written about her is the fact that she has gone so unnoticed." Hurting Settle's reputation is that she does not fit clearly into any type of writer, and wrote on a wide variety of fields; this detracts from a writer's authority.

Life

Early years 
Settle was born in Charleston, West Virginia, the daughter of Joseph Edward and Rachel Tompkins Settle. According to one report her father was a civil engineer in charge of worker safety at coal mines. According to another he owned a coal mine in Kentucky; Mary spent her childhood in Pineville, Kentucky, interrupted by a period in Florida when her father, drawn by the Florida land rush, participated in the design of Venice, Florida. Her family returned to West Virginia, where she spent her teenage years. After two years at Sweet Briar College, she moved to New York City in pursuit of a career as an actress and model, and tested for the part of Scarlett O'Hara in Gone with the Wind.

She married the Englishman Rodney Weathersbee in 1939 and moved to England. "Like [Joseph] Conrad, I was in exile for a long time." The couple had a son, Christopher Weatherbee. During World War II, she joined the British Women's Auxiliary Air Force, and then the Office of War Information.  She divorced her first husband in 1946 and married the Englishman Douglas Newton from whom she divorced in 1956.

Upon returning to the US she started her writing career.  She would later teach at Bard College, the Iowa Writers' Workshop, and University of Virginia.

She lived for many years in Canada, in England, and in Turkey.

In 1978, when she was 60, she married William L. Tazewell, an American writer and historian. He died in 1998.

The Beulah Quintet 
Settle wrote a wide variety of works, including non-fiction, but is most famous for a series of novels she called the Beulah Quintet. They cover the history of the development of people from seventeenth-century England to modern West Virginia: "In them she transferred the European tradition of a continuing fictional-historical saga to an American medium."

The composition of the quintet was complicated; the novels are not of the same form, not in chronological sequence, and do not have common characters or issues between them.
 O Beulah Land (1956)
 Know Nothing (1960)
 Prisons (1973), which is set earlier in time than O Beulah Land
 The Scapegoat (1980) and
 The Killing Ground (1982). This replaces Fight Night on a Sweet Saturday, which Settle describes as her novel she most regrets

The PEN/ Faulkner awards 

Settle founded in 1980 what is the United States's most prestigious and most lucrative prize for fiction: the PEN/Faulkner Awards, whose prize in 2005 was $15,000, . The acronym stands for poets, editors, and novelists, and Faulker is her hero, Southern novelist William Faulkner. The winners are selected by other authors.

Behind Settle's action is her experience as a member of the jury of the National Book Award in 1979, after being awarded its main prize the year before for Blood Tie.

Awards 
In 1978 Settle won the National Book Award for her novel Blood Tie, a novel set in Turkey.

In 1983 she won the Janet Heidinger Kafka Prize for The Killing Ground, the last volume of her series Beulah Quintet.

Death
Settle died of lung cancer in a hospice near Charlottesville, Virginia, on September 27, 2005, aged 87, while working on her last book, an imagined biography of Thomas Jefferson.

Works

Novels
 The Love Eaters (1954)
 The Kiss of Kin (1955). Her first novel, based on her unpublished play of the same name, which was accepted for publication only after the success of The Love Eaters.
 O Beulah Land (1956) (First volume of what would be called the Beulah Quintet.
 Know Nothing (1960)
 Fight Night on a Sweet Saturday (1964)
 The Clam Shell (1970)
 Prisons (1973)
 Blood Tie (1977). This novel, which received the National Book Award in 1978, deals with American and British expatriates in Turkey.
 The Scapegoat (1980)
 The Killing Grounds (1982) "To replace Fight Night on a Sweet Saturday as the final volume of the Beulah Quintet" (list of her books in Learning to Fly).
 Celebration (1986)
 Charley Bland (1989). A widow of thirty-five returns to visit her parents in West Virginia and becomes involved in a love affair with the town's most eligible bachelor.
 Choices (1995). The life of a Southern belle who decided to work rather than play the debutante. The novel chronicles her adventures as a nurse during the bloody Kentucky miners strike and as an ambulance driver in the Spanish Civil War, through World War II, to her return to America in time to take part in the civil rights struggle.
 I, Roger Williams: A Novel (2002)

Memoirs
 All the Brave Promises: The Memories of Aircraft Woman 2nd Class 2146391 (1966)
 Turkish Reflections: A Biography of Place (1991)
 
 Addie: A Memoir (1998)
 Spanish Recognitions: The Road from the Past (2004)

Other non-fiction
 
 
 Water World (1994). On what is in and under the oceans.
 The Story of Flight (1967)

References

Further reading

External links
 "Mary Lee Settle" by Brian O. Hogbin
 
 Stuart A. Rose Manuscript, Archives, and Rare Book Library, Emory University: Mary Lee Settle collection, circa 1985-1987

1918 births
2005 deaths
20th-century American novelists
21st-century American novelists
American women novelists
National Book Award winners
Writers from Charleston, West Virginia
Sweet Briar College alumni
Bard College faculty
Iowa Writers' Workshop faculty
University of Virginia faculty
Deaths from lung cancer
Deaths from cancer in Virginia
20th-century American women writers
21st-century American women writers
Writers of American Southern literature
PEN/Faulkner Award for Fiction winners
Novelists from Virginia
Novelists from West Virginia
Novelists from New York (state)
Novelists from Iowa
People of the United States Office of War Information
American women civilians in World War II
American women academics